A cipher is a method of encryption or decryption.

Cipher may also refer to:

Science and mathematics
 CIPHER (DOS command), an external filter command in some versions of MS-DOS 2.xx
 One of the names for the number 0 in English

Entertainment and culture
 Cipher (manga), a manga series by Minako Narita
 Cipher (comics), a Marvel Comics X-Men character
 Cipher (newuniversal), a Marvel Comics character in the newuniversal imprint
 Bill Cipher, a dream demon in Gravity Falls
 Cipher, the player character in Ace Combat Zero: The Belkan War
 Team Cipher, the villainous team from Pokémon Colosseum and the sequel Pokémon XD: Gale of Darkness
 Cipher, a criminal mastermind and cyber terrorist in The Fate of the Furious
 A codename for The Patriots in the video game series Metal Gear Solid
 A word used by the Five-Percent Nation to refer to zero, letter "O" or a circle
 A playable character class in the role-playing video game Pillars of Eternity

Music
 Cipher (album), by The Alpha Conspiracy
 Cipher (band), a hardcore punk band
 Ciphers (album), a 1996 album by SETI
 Cipher notation, a type of musical notation
 A note that continues to sound in a pipe organ when the organist does not intend for it to sound
 A freestyle rap session

People
 A stage name of Takigawa Ichiro, the guitarist of the Japanese rock band D'erlanger
 Cipha Sounds, the alias of Luis Diaz, an American radio and television personality

See also
 Cyphers